Joe Sparks may refer to:

 Joe Sparks (video game developer), American video game developer, animator, songwriter, web publisher, and multimedia consultant
 Joe Sparks (infielder), Negro league baseball player
 Joe Sparks (coach), American professional baseball player, manager, coach and scout